Bas Schouten (born 19 October 1994 in Hoorn) is a Dutch auto racing driver. Schouten has raced in various international racing series such as the TCR International Series and Acceleration 2014.

Career
After a career in karting in his home country Schouten made his auto racing debut in 2010. Schouten was included in the KNAF Talent First programme together with Steijn Schothorst and Dennis van de Laar. De 15-year-old Dutch driver ran in the amateur BMW E30 Cup in a BMW 325i E30 entered by Bas Koeten Racing. Schouten also ran six races in the Dutch Formula Ford Duratec championship. The best result for the Dutch talent was fifth at Circuit Park Zandvoort. The following year Schouten finished third in the Formula Ford championship. At the annual Formula Ford Festival Schouten finished eighth out of 25 drivers. In 2012 the young Dutchman raced in the Formula Ford and the Benelux Radical SR3 Cup. In the Radical Cup Schouten ended up in the runner-up position in the championship. 

For 2013 the driver from Hoorn, North Holland turned to GT racing. Schouten drove a full season in the Dutch Supercar Challenge Supersport division in a BMW 1 Series GTR. Schouten shared the car with other Dutch drivers such as Jeroen Mul and Joey van Splunteren. Schouten finished third in the championship. The following year Schouten raced in the Dutch Supercar Challenge Super GT class. The Dutchman raced in a Vicora V8, a car derived from the Chevrolet Corvette, entered by Raceway Venray. Running only a partial season Schouten also raced six races in the MW-V6 Pickup Series. At 2014 Acceleration at Navarra Schouten finished fifth in the first two races. The Dutch driver also made return to single seater racing in the Formula Acceleration 1 at Assen. Racing for Acceleration Team Netherlands Schouten finished both races in the top ten.

Racing record

Complete Formula Acceleration 1 results
(key) (Races in bold indicate pole position) (Races in italics indicate fastest lap)

Complete TCR International Series results
(key) (Races in bold indicate pole position) (Races in italics indicate fastest lap)

† Driver did not finish the race, but was classified as he completed over 90% of the race distance.

References

External links
 Bas Schouten Racing

1994 births
Dutch racing drivers
TCR International Series drivers
People from Hoorn
Living people
24H Series drivers
Sportspeople from North Holland
GT4 European Series drivers